The following is the organization of the Union forces engaged at the Siege of Port Hudson, during the American Civil War in 1863. The Confederate order of battle is listed separately.

Abbreviations used

Military rank
 MG = Major General
 BG = Brigadier General
 Col = Colonel
 Ltc = Lieutenant Colonel
 Maj = Major
 Cpt = Captain
 Lt = 1st Lieutenant

Other
 w = wounded
 mw = mortally wounded
 k = killed
 c = captured

Union forces

Army of the Gulf

XIX Corps

MG Nathaniel P. Banks
 Chief of Staff: BG George L. Andrews until 27 May, BG Charles P. Stone
 Chief of Artillery: BG Richard Arnold

West Gulf Blockading Squadron

Rear Admiral David G. Farragut

Notes

References

 
 

American Civil War orders of battle